Yang Borun (1837–1911), born Yang Peifu (杨佩夫), was a well-known Chinese poet, calligrapher, and painter of the Shanghai School.

Yang was born to a scholarly family in Jiaxing, Zhejiang, he arrived in Shanghai in the early 1860s. Yang sold his paintings, mostly landscapes, to support the family. Some of them are in the collections of museums in Shanghai, Tokyo, Hong Kong, Taiwan, and Cleveland. A book of Yang's poetry is held at the Harvard University Yenching Library. Samples of his calligraphy have been published in Japan.

References
Anita  Chung (ed.), Chinese Painting from the Shanghai Museum, 1851-1911. Edinburgh: National Museum of Scotland, 2000.
Yang Borun, Nanhu caotang shiji (Collected Poems from the Thatched Hut of the South lake), Shanghai, 1882
Ka Shoki Yo Hakujun, Tokyo: Nigensha, 2001

See also

 Chinese art
 Chinese painting

Qing dynasty calligraphers
Qing dynasty painters
Qing dynasty poets
1837 births
1911 deaths
Painters from Zhejiang
Writers from Jiaxing
Poets from Zhejiang
19th-century Chinese painters
20th-century Chinese painters
Artists from Jiaxing
19th-century Chinese calligraphers